The 1914 USC Trojans football team represented the University of Southern California (USC) in the 1914 college football season. In their first year under head coach Ralph Glaze, and following a three-year hiatus in the football program, the Trojans compiled a 4–3 record  and outscored their opponents by a combined total of 116 to 88. The season featured USC's first game outside California and second game against future members of the Pacific Coast Conference and eventually the Pac-12 Conference (USC had played Stanford in 1905). In that game, played on November 26, 1914, USC lost to Oregon Agricultural (later Oregon State) by a 38 to 6 score.

Schedule

References

USC Trojans
USC Trojans football seasons
USC Trojans football